James Swain (born June 7, 1956) is an American crime fiction author and magician.

Swain has written at more than fifteen fiction and non-fiction books. Many have been translated into twelve languages.  He has used two main characters in most of his crime related and mystery books. These are Tony Valentine, a private eye and Jack Carpenter, an ex-cop turned child rescuer. Swain is lesser known for his "Magic" non-fiction books which are self-published. Swain's recent books have been declared "Mysteries of the Year" by Publishers Weekly and Kirkus Reviews.

He has received two nominations for the Barry Award. In 2006, he was awarded the Prix Calibre 38 for best American Crime Fiction for his Tony Valentine series. He has received an award for his fiction from "Florida Book."

The "Tony Valentine" rights were purchased in 2009 by Langley Films for theatrical purposes. An agreement allows Swain to write the first screenplay adaptation.

Swain was researching a story about poker hustling for Men's Journal in 2009 and the team of hustlers he found agreed to let him write a series of novels based on their experiences after a five-year delay, leading to the "Billy Cunningham" series.

Biography
Jim Swain lives in Odessa, Florida with his wife, Laura. One of his hobbies is gambling and gambling scams. Another is magic, because he once worked as a magician.

Style
Swain has created two ex-police characters that have run in a series of mystery and crime related novels. The Tony Valentine character seem to face daily some type of cheater or scammer that involves gambling. The second character, Jack Carpenter, faces the dirtier side of life involving child abduction.

Format
Swain uses four basic acts in most of his novels. His older book series run from the low 300 to the low 400 pages while the newer series run at 400 pages. His beat format for the older series is consistent with older crime novels. His recent series seem to use a 15 beat format that is consistent with current standards.

Bibliography

Novels
The Man Who Walked Through Walls, 1989 Hardback, St Martins Press, 260 pages,    
The Man Who Cheated Death, 2010 eBook, 
Dark Magic, 2012, Tor Books,   
Shadow People, 2013, Tor Books, 

Billy Cunningham series

Billy Cunningham is a cheater from Providence, Rhode Island who moved to Las Vegas and recruits his own team of cheaters to scam casinos. He's unusually moral for a conman and frequently refers to the "cheaters code" about helping other cheaters.

Take Down, 2015 Paperback, Thomas & Mercer,   
Bad Action, 2016 Paperback, Thomas & Mercer,   

Tony Valentine series

The character Tony Valentine is a retired cop from New Jersey and more importantly from the beat of the casinos in Atlantic City. After settling in Florida he is lured to Las Vegas and makes an impact with his consultant skills against casino cheaters.

Grift Sense, 2001 Hardback, 2005 Softback, Balantine Books, 336 pages, Softback   
Funny Money, 2002 Hardback, 2007 Softback, Atria, 304 pages,   
Sucker Bet, 2003 Hardback, 2004 Softback, Fawcett, 336 pages,   
Loaded Dice, 2004 Hardback, 2005 Softback, Balantine Books, 320 pages, Softback   
Mr. Lucky, 2005 Hardback, 2007 Softback, Balantine Books, 432 pages, Softback   
Deadman's Poker, 2006 Hardback, 2006 Softback, Fawcett, 384 pages,    
Deadman's Bluff, 2006 Hardback, 2004 Softback, Fawcett, Page 384,   
Wild Card, 2010 eBook, 
Jackpot, 2010 eBook, 

Jack Carpenter series

Jack Carpenter is an ex-cop from South Florida who was terminated because of using excessive force to a criminal. He turns to private eye work with a soft touch for children.

Midnight Rambler, 2007 hardback, 2008, softback, Ballantine Books, 400 pages, Softback   
The Night Stalker, 2008 hardback, 2009 softback, Ballantine books, 400 pages, Softback  
The Night Monster, 2009 hardback,  Ballantine books, 400 pages, Hardback   
The Program, 2010 ebook, Ballantine books, ebook

Non-fiction
Don't Blink: The Magic of James Swain, 1992, spiral-bound, self-published by J. Swain, 
Miracles with Cards, 1996 spiral-bound, 2010 hardback, self-published by J. Swain, 
21st Century Card Magic, 1999 spiral-bound, 2010 hardback, self-published by J. Swain,

References

External links
The official web site of James Swain
James Swain webpage
Archived: The official web site of the Tony Valentine Novels by James Swain
Amazon on James Swain

Living people
20th-century American novelists
21st-century American novelists
American male novelists
People from Odessa, Florida
1956 births
20th-century American male writers
21st-century American male writers
American magicians